Alessandro Scatena (born 20 December 1946 in Lucca) was an Italian athlete who mainly competed in the 400 metre hurdles.

Biography
He won one medal, at senior level, at the International athletics competitions. He has 10 caps in national team from 1966 to 1972.

National titles
In the "Salvatore Morale era" Alessandro Scatena has won just one time the individual national championship.
1 win in the 400 metres hurdles (19671)

See also
 400 metres hurdles winners of Italian Athletics Championships

References

External links
 Alessandro Scatena at All-athletics.com

1946 births
Living people
Italian male hurdlers
Mediterranean Games gold medalists for Italy
Athletes (track and field) at the 1967 Mediterranean Games
Mediterranean Games medalists in athletics